José Daras (born 28 May 1948 in Malonne) is a Belgian politician and a member of Ecolo.

Early professional career

Before dedicating his life to his political career, José Daras taught geography during 10 years.

Political career

He is one of the founder of the green party Ecolo, created in 1980.

From 1981 to 1999, He was a member of the Belgian federal parliament.

He was minister of transports, energy and mobility in the Walloon government from 1999 to 2004.

He was elected as a member of the Belgian Senate in 2007.

Notes

1948 births
Living people
Ecolo politicians
Members of the Belgian Federal Parliament
People from Namur (city)